German submarine U-147 was a Type IID U-boat of the German Navy (Kriegsmarine) during World War II. She was laid down on 10 April 1940 at Deutsche Werke in Kiel as yard number 276, launched on 16 November 1940 and commissioned on 11 December under the command of Kapitänleutnant Reinhard Hardegen.

Design
German Type IID submarines were enlarged versions of the original Type IIs. U-147 had a displacement of  when at the surface and  while submerged. She had two shafts and two  propellers.

U-147 was fitted with three  torpedo tubes at the bow, five torpedoes or up to twelve Type A torpedo mines, and a  anti-aircraft gun. The boat had a complement of 25.

Operational career

First patrol
U-147s first patrol was preceded by a short trip from Kiel to Bergen in Norway on 22 February 1941. She then left the Nordic port on 22 February and headed for the Atlantic north and west of Scotland.

She arrived back in Kiel on 12 March.

Second patrol
The boat's second foray was similar to her first, except it started from Kiel. She sank no other ships and put into Bergen on 11 May.

Third patrol and loss
U-147s third and final patrol began on 24 May 1941. A week later, she torpedoed the British freighter Gravelines northwest of the Bloody Foreland (western Ireland), which broke in two and was declared a total loss; the forward part of the ship was towed to the Clyde and scrapped. On 2 June U-147 encountered convoy OB 239 north-west of Ireland and attacked alone (a decision which historian Clay Blair described as "bold"). She damaged one ship (Mokambo) before being sunk with all hands by convoy escorts, the destroyer  and the corvette .

Summary of raiding history

Cultural references

U-147 is erroneously named as the German submarine setting of the 12 May 1959 episode, "The Haunted U-Boat", of the American supernatural anthology series Alcoa Presents: One Step Beyond.

References

Bibliography

External links

1940 ships
German Type II submarines
Ships built in Kiel
U-boats commissioned in 1940
U-boats sunk by British warships
U-boats sunk in 1941
World War II submarines of Germany
World War II shipwrecks in the Atlantic Ocean
Ships lost with all hands
Maritime incidents in June 1941